Silke is a surname.

Those bearing it include:

 Seán Silke (born 1950), Irish hurler
 Andrew Silke, British scholar of terrorism
 Ray Silke (born 1970), Irish footballer
 John Silke, sound designer and voice actor
 Robert Silke (born 1979), South African architect